The 2011 National Club Baseball Association (NCBA) Division I World Series was played at Golden Park in Columbus, GA from May 27 to June 2. The eleventh tournament's champion was East Carolina University.  The Most Valuable Player of the tournament was Maurice Mackey of East Carolina University.

Format
The format for the NCBA Division I World Series was modified in 2011. From 2001 to 2010, there were two separate four team double elimination brackets similar to the NCAA College World Series with the exception a one-game championship between the two bracket winners.

Starting in 2011, the losers of Games 1-4 were sent to the other half of the bracket. With this format, there could be a possibility of two teams meeting in the first round playing in the national championship game (this happened in this World Series as East Carolina and Florida State met in the first round and played each other in the title game).

Participants

Results

Bracket

* denotes game went to extra innings

Game Results

Championship Game

See also
2011 NCBA Division I Tournament
2011 NCBA Division II World Series
2011 NCBA Division II Tournament

References

2011 in baseball
Baseball in Georgia (U.S. state)
National Club Baseball Association